Walid Belguerfi (born 19 December 1986) is an Algerian professional footballer. He currently plays as a forward for the Algerian Ligue 2 club CA Bordj Bou Arreridj.

Club career

Olympique de Médéa
Since his club's promotion to Ligue 2, Belguerfi has scored 2 goals in matches against RC Kouba and USM Bel-Abbès.

Statistics

References

External links

1986 births
Living people
Algerian footballers
Olympique de Médéa players
Algerian Ligue 2 players
CA Bordj Bou Arréridj players
People from Kouba
Algerian Ligue Professionnelle 1 players
USM Bel Abbès players
Association football forwards
21st-century Algerian people